The Alaska National Interest Lands Conservation Act (ANILCA) is a United States federal law signed by President Jimmy Carter on December 2, 1980. It was, and remains to date, the single largest expansion of protected lands in history and more than doubled the size of the National Park System.

Protected areas

The act provided for the creation or expansion of several Conservation System Units (CSUs) including:

 significant changes to the Arctic National Wildlife Refuge
 Admiralty Island National Monument
 Aniakchak National Monument and Preserve
 Bering Land Bridge National Preserve
 Cape Krusenstern National Monument
 Denali National Park
 Gates Of The Arctic National Park and Preserve
 Glacier Bay National Park and Preserve
 Katmai National Park and Preserve
 Kenai Fjords National Park
 Kenai National Wildlife Refuge
 Kobuk Valley National Park
 Lake Clark National Park and Preserve
 Misty Fjords National Monument
 Noatak National Preserve
 Wrangell - St Elias National Park and Preserve
 Yukon-Charley Rivers National Preserve
 Yukon Delta National Wildlife Refuge
 Yukon Flats National Wildlife Refuge

Alaska Native Claims Settlement Act
In 1971 the Alaska Native Claims Settlement Act (ANCSA) was signed into law to resolve the long-standing issues surrounding aboriginal land claims in Alaska, as well as to stimulate economic development throughout Alaska. Section 17(d)(1) gave the Secretary of the Interior ninety days to withdraw from development any lands necessary "to insure that the public interest in these lands is properly protected." Additionally, Section 17(d)(2) directed the Secretary of the Interior to withdraw up to 80 million acres of land from development for conservation purposes. These lands, referred to as "d-2" lands, were to be available for potential congressional designation as National Parks, Wildlife Refuges, Wild and Scenic rivers, or National Forests. The "d-2" provision of ANCSA gave the Secretary nine months to withdraw lands before they would re-open to development. On December 17, 1972, Interior Secretary Rogers Morton forwarded  of selected lands to Congress under 17(d)(1) and 17(d)(2), known as the "Morton Proposal." These lands were withdrawn from all forms of public appropriation under the public land laws pending action from Congress, setting the stage for the eventual passage of ANILCA.

Sunset provisions
As stated, the "d-2" provision of ANCSA set a deadline for the Secretary to withdraw lands within nine months of the passage of ANCSA. In addition, ANCSA also set a deadline for Congress to act on the Secretary's withdrawal within five years of the passage of ANCSA; if the Secretary did not act to withdraw lands earmarked for special protections within nine months of the passage of ANCSA, or Congress did not act to implement the Secretary's selection within five years of the passage of ANCSA, the lands would be reopened to development.

Early Legislation
On January 29, 1973 Congressman James A. Haley (D-Florida) introduced the Morton proposal as H.R. 12336, and the next day Senator Henry M. Jackson (D-Washington) introduced the Senate version of the bill. These bills were the first of many failed proposals leading to the eventual passage of ANILCA seven years later. Over the course of the seven years many bills were introduced with a wide range of proposals for disposal of the selected lands.

As the sunset date approached in 1978 both chambers of Congress scrambled to pass a bill. On May 19, 1978, H.R. 39 was passed by the House of Representatives. H.R. 39 was referred to the Senate Committee on Energy and Natural Resources for mark up and combined with a number of other bills pertaining to Alaska lands. Senator Ted Stevens (R-Alaska) was instrumental in making significant changes to the original House resolution. The final bill submitted by the Senate energy committee was deemed unacceptable by the Carter administration and supporters of H.R. 39 in the House. With limited time left before adjournment, the House and Senate conferenced in order to resolve differences between the two bills. Senator Mike Gravel (D-Alaska) inserted himself into the negotiations, making a number of new demands not included in either bill. Changes made to the bill did not satisfy Gravel, and he refused to support the bill. With adjournment fast approaching, a provision to extend the (d)(2) protections for one more year to allow for additional time to pass a bill was passed in the House, and introduced in the Senate on October 16, 1978. Gravel threatened a filibuster, and the provision did not pass the Senate. The sunset provision of section (d)(2) of ANCSA was set to expire on December 18, 1978.

Use of the Antiquities Act

The Interior Department and the National Park Service became concerned as 1978 dragged on that no action would be taken on the "national interest lands" included in the Morton Proposal, and as early as July 1978 the Park Service had taken the first steps to secure additional protection when it began to draft national monument proclamations for proposed NPS areas.

President Carter used the Antiquities Act to designate 56 million acres as 17 National Monuments by executive order on December 1, 1978. Much of the lands designated as National Monument were part of the original Morton Proposal. An additional 40 million acres were withdrawn under the authority of section 204(c) of the Federal Land Policy and Management Act by Interior Secretary Cecil Andrus.

Carter stated that he had been forced to use the Antiquities Act by Congress's failure to act in a reasonable time, but his actions nevertheless caused wide protest across Alaska. President Carter was burned in effigy in Fairbanks. Residents in the Cantwell area undertook a large act of civil disobedience known as the Great Denali Trespass — they went into the park, fired off guns, made campfires, and conducted various other activities prohibited under Federal regulations. The towns of Eagle and Glennallen, both in the shadow of new monuments, produced official proclamations stating that the towns would not support NPS authorities, not enforce NPS regulations, and would shelter individuals who broke the regulations.

Though these protests continued for some time, the designation of the monuments broke the legislative opposition to ANILCA.  Some in Congress, and various oil and gas industry, and other development interest, continued to oppose passage of the bill, but in the wake of Carter's proclamations most opponents recognized the need to work toward passage of an acceptable bill, rather than no bill at all. However, in 1978, 75 seats in the House had changed hands, producing a much more conservative body than the one that had supported Carter's use of the Antiquities Act. Proponents were forced to continue to work compromises, and the bill's passage was further delayed.

Final passage
In early November 1980, Jimmy Carter lost re-election to Ronald Reagan, and the Republican Party won a majority of seats in the Senate. Conservationists and other proponents of the legislation recognized that if they did not accept the compromise then on the table, they would be forced to begin again in the next Congress with decidedly less support. The bill was passed in late November, and signed into law by President Carter in December.

Selected provisions
 Lands claimed by Alaska Natives under ANCSA are officially recognized.
 Native land claims pending as of December 18, 1971, are officially approved.
 Existing timber contracts are to be filled with timber from other national forest lands.
 If private land is surrounded by conservation system units "adequate and feasible" access must be guaranteed.

Ramifications
Senator Gravel, meanwhile, took considerable blame in Alaska for forcing Carter's hand with the Antiquities Act. Though Carter was hardly held blameless for the creation of the new national monuments, Gravel was taken to task for the unpopular decision as well and was denied his party's nomination for his Senate seat in the 1980 election.

With the passage of time, however, and now, several decades later, support for the vision of ANILCA has increased, even among former detractors in Alaska—as the spectacular parks, monuments, refuges and other areas set aside by the 1980 legislation have become a significant boon to Alaska tourism and the State's economy. A telephone poll in 2000 showed that 45 percent of Alaskans supported the protection of the ANILCA-designated 1002 coastal plain area of the Arctic National Wildlife Refuge, the most controversial aspect of ANILCA's protected areas, while 49 percent opposed the protection.

The final bill accelerated logging in the Tongass National Forest, the nation's largest, by giving the US Forest Service a yearly $40,000,000 appropriation to cut timber, not subject to the appropriation laws but derived from the taxes on oil etc, and by providing that 450 million board feet of trees would be clearcut each year. This was the price conservationists paid in the compromise.

Impact on Alaska Natives
Under Title VIII, Subsistence Management And Use, not just Alaska Natives qualified but also rural residents were granted hunting and fishing rights when fish and game are not under outside threat. In addition the bill expedited the enactment of the 1971 Alaska Native Claims Settlement Act.

References

External links
 Text as amended (PDF/details) in the GPO Statute Compilations collection

1980 in Alaska
1980 in law
1980 in the environment
96th United States Congress
 
Nature conservation in the United States
United States federal environmental legislation
United States federal public land legislation
Law
Native
Native American law
Native
Alaska Natives and United States law